Et tu, Brute? is a Latin phrase literally meaning "and you, Brutus?" or "also you, Brutus?", often translated as "You as well, Brutus?", "You too, Brutus?", or "Even you, Brutus?". The quote appears in Act 3 Scene 1 of William Shakespeare's play Julius Caesar, where it is spoken by the Roman dictator Julius Caesar, at the moment of his assassination, to his friend Marcus Junius Brutus, upon recognizing him as one of the assassins. The first known occurrences of the phrase are said to be in two earlier Elizabethan plays; Henry VI, Part 3 by Shakespeare, and an even earlier play, Caesar Interfectus, by Richard Edes. The phrase is often used apart from the plays to signify an unexpected betrayal by a friend. 

There is no evidence that the historical Caesar spoke these words. Though the historical Caesar's last words are not known with certainty, the Roman historian Suetonius, a century and a half after the incident, claims Caesar said nothing as he died, but that others reported that Caesar's last words were the Greek phrase Kai su, teknon (Και συ τέκνον), which means "You too, child" or "You too, young man" to Brutus. Contrary to popular belief, the words are not Caesar's last in the play, as he says "Then fall Caesar!" right after.

Etymology 
The name Brutus, a second declension masculine noun, appears in the phrase in the vocative case, and so the -us ending of the nominative case is replaced by -e.

Context 
On March 15 (the Ides of March), 44 BC, the historic Caesar was attacked by a group of senators, including Brutus, who was Caesar's friend and protégé. Caesar initially resisted his attackers, but when he saw Brutus, he reportedly responded as he died. Suetonius mentions the quote merely as a rumor, as does Plutarch who also reports that Caesar said nothing, but merely pulled his toga over his head when he saw Brutus among the conspirators.

Caesar saying Et tu, Brute? in Shakespeare's play Julius Caesar (1599) was not the first time the phrase was used in a dramatic play. Edmond Malone claimed that it appeared in a work that has since been lost—Richard Edes's Latin play Caesar Interfectus of 1582. The phrase had also occurred in another play by Shakespeare, The True Tragedie of Richard Duke of Yorke, and the death of good King Henrie the Sixth, with the Whole Contention betweene the two Houses Lancaster and Yorke of 1595, which is the earliest printed version of Henry VI, Part 3.

Interpretation 
It has been argued that the phrase can be interpreted as a curse or warning. One theory states that the historic Caesar adapted the words of a Greek sentence which to the Romans had long since become proverbial: The complete phrase is said to have been "You too, my son, will have a taste of power", of which Caesar only needed to invoke the opening words to foreshadow Brutus' own violent death, in response to his assassination. The poem Satires; Book I, Satire 7 by Horace, written approximately 30 BC, mentions Brutus and his tyrannicide; in discussing that poem, author John Henderson considers that the expression E-t t-u Br-u-t-e, (as he hyphenates it), can be interpreted as a complaint containing a "suggestion of mimetic compulsion".

See also
 List of Latin phrases (E)

References

External links
 Et tu, Brute? on Merriam-Webster

Julius Caesar (play)
Latin quotations
Shakespearean phrases
16th-century neologisms